Denis Leonardo Gomez Lozano (born 7 October 1991), commonly known as Denis Gomez, is a Colombian professional footballer who plays as a right-back or right midfielder.

Clubs
 Atlético Bucaramanga: 2011
 América de Cali: 2011
 Uniautónoma: 2013
 Jaguares de Córdoba: 2013–2015
 Atletico Huila: 2015–2016
 Jaguares de Córdoba: 2016
 Águilas Doradas Rionegro: 2017–2019

Club career
From 2007, Gomez played for América de Cali. First, he started in the U17 team and as of 2010 he played for the U19 team and participated in the national U19 Championship, Campeonato Postobón Sub19. In 2009, he played several matches in the Copa Postobón tournament for the first team of América de Cali.

References

External links
 
 

1991 births
Living people
Colombian footballers
Association football fullbacks
Association football midfielders
Categoría Primera A players
Atlético Bucaramanga footballers
América de Cali footballers
Uniautónoma F.C. footballers
Jaguares de Córdoba footballers
Atlético Huila footballers
Águilas Doradas Rionegro players